Oasis is a 2002 South Korean psychological drama romance film directed by Lee Chang-dong. The film's plot tells about the difficult romance between a mildly mentally disabled man who has just been released from jail after a -year sentence for involuntary manslaughter and a woman with severe cerebral palsy. Starring in these roles are the couple from Lee Chang-dong's previous film Peppermint Candy: Sol Kyung-gu and Moon So-ri. The movie also shows how the two main characters are treated by their families and perceived by the people around them.

The film was a critical success, earning prizes in numerous film festivals. Among the most important were Silver Lion for Best Direction and the Special Director's prize given to Lee Chang-dong at the 2002 Venice Film Festival and the Marcello Mastroianni Award for Emerging Actor or Actress given to Moon So-ri at the same event.

Plot
Upon his release from prison, Hong Jong-du (Sol Kyung-gu) goes looking for his relatives in Seoul. He is back on the streets after serving a two-and-a-half-year prison term for a hit-and-run accident. He discovers that during his absence, his family moved without telling him. Oblivious to society's rules, he again ends up in police custody for non-payment of a restaurant bill. He is bailed out by his younger brother Jong-sae (Ryoo Seung-wan) and reunited with his estranged family, who reluctantly take him back in. Slightly mentally disabled and an incurable social misfit, Jong-du is hired as a delivery boy for a Chinese restaurant on the recommendation of his older brother Jong-il (Ahn Nae-sang).

In an awkward attempt at reconciliation, Jong-du seeks out the family of the man killed in the accident. He finds the man's son, Han Sang-shik (Son Byong-ho) is moving out and leaving behind his cerebral palsy-stricken sister Gong-ju (Moon So-ri) to be cared for by the neighbors while he uses her disability status to get a better subsidized apartment where he pretends she is living. The family is horrified at Jong-du's intrusion, but he becomes intrigued by Gong-ju.

Jong-du decides to woo her by sending flowers and discovers where her house keys are hidden. He lets himself in at a time when he knows she is alone. He awkwardly make conversation and leaves his card for her to call him if she wants. Leaving, he notices and becomes interested in her feet, claiming to have never seen a woman's bare foot before. Gong-ju is startled and distressed at this extremely invasive comment from a complete stranger. Trying to pacify the startled Gong-ju, Jong-du loses control and starts to sexually assault the helpless woman, stopping only when she faints.

Fired from his job after crashing the scooter, Jong-du is given the opportunity to work in his brother's auto repair shop, where he also sleeps at night. A couple of days later to his surprise, Gong-ju calls him in the middle of night. After a number of secret encounters and outings, nearly being discovered by their families or the neighbors, the two misfits become inseparable. Gong-ju tells him how frightened she is of a shadow from a tree outside her window. Jong-du promises her that she no longer has to be afraid because he will make the shadows disappear by magic.

On their adventures outside of the apartment, the couple is faced with the harsh reality of a discriminating society but is comforted by the innocent sanctity of their love. When Jong-du naively brings Gong-ju to his mother's birthday celebration, tempers flare and viewers learn that his older brother was the actual culprit of the hit-and-run: his family was glad when Jong-du volunteered to go to jail in his place.

Wanting to be treated like a woman, Gong-ju invites Jong-du back to her apartment, where they make love. When her brother arrives on a surprise visit, chaos erupts. Jong-du is arrested and charged with raping a handicapped woman. Gong-ju's family and the police ignore Gong-ju who is too overcome with emotion and distress at the misunderstanding to make herself heard or understood. In a final burst of passion, Jong-du escapes from the police and rushes to Gong-ju's apartment. The couple reaffirms their love as Jong-du fulfills his promise of making the shadows disappear by climbing the tree and cutting the branches off. He then falls and is hauled off to prison, having committed several additional crimes in his trip to see Gong-ju whose exoneration can no longer fully protect him. In the last scene, Gong-ju is cleaning her apartment alone, while Jong-du's voice is heard reading a letter to her, promising to come back when he is released.

Awards and nominations

References

External links
 
 
 
 Darcy Paquet's review at Koreanfilm.org

2002 films
2002 romantic drama films
2000s psychological drama films
South Korean romantic drama films
South Korean independent films
Films about people with cerebral palsy
Films directed by Lee Chang-dong
Films set in Seoul
2000s Korean-language films
CJ Entertainment films
2002 drama films
2000s South Korean films
Films about disability